Treadwell Twichell (November 19, 1864 – December 24, 1937) was an American politician who served in both the North Dakota Senate and the House of Representatives and was also elected as North Dakota Speaker in 1907.

Early life
Twichell was born on November 19, 1864, in Hastings, Minnesota, United States, the son of Luther L. and Sally Twichell. After his father's death in 1880, Treadwell, then 17, left high school and went to North Dakota to manage his late father's land holdings near Mapleton, North Dakota. Treadwell would remain involved in agriculture for the rest of his life. Treadwell had a sibling, Luther Lathrop, who would also be elected as Speaker in 1921. On November 26, 1890, Treadwell married Grace B. Dill of Prescott, Wisconsin, who he had four children with.

Political career
Twichell was elected to two terms in the North Dakota House of Representatives, in 1895 and 1897. In 1899, he was elected to the North Dakota Senate. From 1901 to 1905, Treadwell served as Sheriff of Cass County. In 1907, he was once again elected to the House of Representatives where he became Speaker. In 1908, Twichell was nominated for governor at the Progressive Republican Convention but lost to his opponent in the primary. Mr. Twichell was again elected to the House of Representatives in 1913 and the Senate in 1915. He was known as an advocate of reform legislation and battled aggressively against boss rule in state politics. He was a delegate to the 1912 national Republican convention and a longtime township official. He is credited with building the first gravel highway in North Dakota and organizing the first cooperative grain elevator enterprise in the state.

Death
Twichell died on December 24, 1937, in Mapleton, North Dakota, where he was buried.

References

1864 births
1937 deaths
People from Hastings, Minnesota
North Dakota state senators
Members of the North Dakota House of Representatives